There have been five ships in the Royal Navy to bear the name HMS Illustrious. The ship's motto is "Vox Non Incerta" which translates as "No Uncertain Sound".

  was a 74-gun third rate, and launched at Buckler's Hard in 1789. She had two engagements against the French Navy, at Toulon in 1793 and at Genoa where she suffered severe damage and won a battle honour. While returning home in tow for repairs she ran aground due to an extremely violent storm. Shortly afterwards she was set ablaze and abandoned.
  was launched at Rotherhithe in 1803 and was like her predecessor a 74-gun third rate. She was involved in battles off the Basque Roads, in which she won a battle honour, and off Java in Indonesia. In 1854 she became a training ship and continued as one until she was broken up in 1868 in Portsmouth.
Two of her 12-inch guns were remounted in the Tyne Turrets.
  was an  commissioned in 1940. In the same year she became the first carrier to strike against an enemy fleet, and was in service until 1954.
  was an  commissioned in 1982 and decommissioned in 2014.

Battle honours
Genoa 1795
Basque Roads 1809
Taranto 1940
Mediterranean 1940–1941
Malta Convoys 1941
Diego Suarez 1942
Salerno 1943
Sabang 1944
Palembang 1945
Okinawa 1945

References
Royal Navy History

Royal Navy ship names